Kennon Marshall Sheldon is a professor of psychological sciences at the University of Missouri in Columbia, Missouri. His research is in the areas of well-being, motivation, self-determination theory, personality, and positive psychology. In 2002 he was a recipient of a Templeton Foundation "Positive Psychology" prize and in 2014 received the Ed and Carol Diener award for mid-career achievement in personality psychology.  He is the author of Optimal Human Being: An Integrated Multi-level Perspective, Self-determination Theory in the Clinic:  Motivating physical and mental health, and has written and edited several other academic books, as well as more than 200 academic articles and book chapters.

References

External links
Kennon M. Sheldon, Ph.D., Faculty page at the University of Missouri
Interview on Hidden Brain podcast https://hiddenbrain.org/podcast/what-do-you-want-to-be/

Living people
Year of birth missing (living people)
21st-century American psychologists
University of Missouri faculty